Ken Kennedy  may refer to:

 Kenneth Kennedy (speed skater) (1913–1985), Australian Olympic speed skater
 Kenneth A. R. Kennedy (1930–2014), American anthropologist
 Kenneth Kennedy (bishop) (died 1943), Anglican bishop in India, 1926–1936
 Mr. Kennedy (born 1976), aka Ken Kennedy, ring name of professional wrestler Kenneth Anderson
 Ken Kennedy (computer scientist) (1945–2007), computer scientist from Rice University, father of High Performance Fortran
 Ken Kennedy (rugby union) (1941–2022), Ireland international rugby union footballer